Homo longi is an extinct species of archaic human identified from a nearly complete skull, nicknamed 'Dragon Man', from Harbin on the Northeast China Plain, dating to at minimum 146,000 years ago during the Middle Pleistocene. Due to a tumultuous wartime atmosphere, it was hidden and only brought to paleoanthropologists in 2018. The original describers postulated H. longi represents a member of the Denisovans, though this is unconfirmable without genetic testing. They also considered modern humans to be more closely related to H. longi than to the European Neanderthals, but DNA evidence suggests Denisovans are more closely related to Neanderthals than modern humans.

H. longi is broadly anatomically similar to other Middle Pleistocene Chinese specimens. Like other archaic humans, the skull is low and long, with massively developed brow ridges, wide eye sockets, and a large mouth. The skull is the longest ever found from any human species. Like modern humans, the face is rather flat, but the nose was rather large. The brain volume was 1,420 cc, within the range of modern humans and Neanderthals.

The Harbin individual inhabited a cold, steppeland environment alongside the woolly mammoth, giant deer, Przewalski's horse, elk, buffalo, and brown bear.

Taxonomy

Etymology 
The specific name for H. longi is derived from the geographic name Longjiang (literally "Dragon River"), a term commonly used for the Chinese province Heilongjiang.

Discovery 

Recognizing its importance, likely as a result of public interest in anthropology recently generated by the Peking Man in 1929, he hid it from the Manchukuo authorities in an abandoned well. After the Soviet invasion of Manchuria, ending the Japanese occupation of the region, he concealed his former employment from the Nationalist and later the Communist authorities. Consequently, he could not report the skull, lest he divulge his ties to the Japanese imperialists in explaining its origin.

Before his death, the third generation of his family learned of the skull, and reclaimed it in 2018. Later that year, Chinese paleoanthropologist Ji Qiang persuaded the family to donate it to the Hebei GEO University for study, where it has since been stored. Its catalogue number is HBSM2018-000018(A).

Age 
Owing to the skull's history, its exact provenance, and thus its stratigraphic context and age, has been difficult to determine.

Direct uranium–thorium dating of various points on the skull yielded a wide range of dates, from 296 to 62 thousand years ago, likely a result of uranium leaching. They statistically determined the most likely minimum age is 146,000 years old, but a more exact value is difficult to determine, given that the exact provenance is unidentifiable. Nonetheless, the skull is well-constrained to the late Middle Pleistocene, roughly contemporaneous with other Chinese specimens from Xiahe, Jinniushan, Dali, and Hualong Cave.

Classification 

In two simultaneously published papers, Ji and colleagues declared the Harbin skull to represent a new species they dubbed Homo longi. The Harbin skull is quite similar to the Dali skull, and when the Dali skull was discovered in 1978, it was given a new nomen H. sapiens daliensis by its discoverer Wu Xinzhi who soon thereafter abandoned the name. Consequently, should the Middle Pleistocene Asian humans represent a single unique species, the nomen H. daliensis would take priority. Though they recommended resurrecting H. daliensis, they argued H. longi is sufficiently distinct, and allocated only the Dali and Hualong remains (often allocated to H. heidelbergensis by convention) to H. daliensis; thus, they claim at least two human species inhabited late Middle Pleistocene China. One of the authors, Chris Stringer, stated that he would have preferred assigning the Harbin skull to H. daliensis.

Based on the conspicuously massive size of the molars, they suggested H. longi is most closely related to and possibly the same species as the Xiahe mandible from Tibet, which has been grouped with the enigmatic Denisovans, an archaic human lineage apparently dispersed across East Asia during the Middle and Late Pleistocene currently identifiable from only a genetic signature. The Xiahe mandible is also anatomically similar to specimens from Xujiayao and Penghu. Ji, Ni and colleagues further contend that Middle Pleistocene Asian specimens are more closely related to modern humans (H. sapiens) than the European Neanderthals, though nuclear DNA and ancient protein analyses place the Xiahe mandible and Denisovans more closely to Neanderthals than to modern humans.

Anatomy 
H. longi is characterized by a low and long skull, receding forehead, extremely wide upper face, a large nasal opening equating to an enlarged nose (possibly an adaptation to the cold air), large and square eye sockets, inflated and thick brow ridges (supraorbital torus), flat cheekbones (zygomatic bone), a wide palate and large tooth sockets (equating to a large mouth), and a broad base of the skull.

H. longi had a massive brain at roughly 1,420 cc, above the range of all known human species except modern humans and Neanderthals. Nonetheless, post-orbital constriction (constriction of the braincase just behind the eyes, equating to the frontal lobe, absent in modern humans) is more developed in H. longi than in Neanderthals, although not so much as in more-ancient human species. Overall, the braincase retains an array of archaic features, though the occipital bone at the back of the skull has a weakly-defined sagittal keel that lacks a protuberance at the midpoint, unlike most other archaic humans. Unlike the Dali and Hualong Cave skulls, the keel does not run across the midline. Unlike modern humans or Neanderthals, the parietal bones on the top of the head do not significantly expand or protrude.

Despite the face being so wide, it was rather flat (reduced mid-facial prognathism), and resembles the anatomy found in modern humans, the far more ancient H. antecessor, and other Middle Pleistocene Chinese specimens. Nonetheless, the tooth sockets for the incisors were angled outward (alveolar prognathism). The H. longi skull's mosaic morphology of archaic and derived traits converges with some of the earliest specimens assigned to H. sapiens from Africa, notably Rabat and Eliye Springs. Because the original describers judged the Harbin skull to be closely allied with the Xiahe mandible, they believed H. longi lacked a chin, like other archaic humans, but the specimen's lower jaw was not recovered. The Harbin molar is oval-shaped, badly worn, and nearly flat.

Ni and colleagues believed the Harbin skull represents a male, judging by the robustness and size of the skull, who was less than 50 years old, looking at the suture closures and the degree of tooth wearing. They speculated H. longi had perhaps medium-dark to medium-light skin, dark hair, and dark eye color based on reconstructed genetic sequences from Neanderthals, Denisovans, and early modern humans.

Pathology 
The left parietal features shallow indents around the bregma, possibly from a healed injury. The second left upper molar does not appear to have been in contact with the third molar, which means either that the third molar was small (creating a gap), or it was absent in this individual.

Paleoenvironment 

Due to the Pleistocene glaciation (the Ice Ages), the Earth continually swung from frigid glacial periods to warmer interglacials. The period from 300 to 130 thousand years ago spans the Penultimate Glacial Period, and the permafrost zone may have stretched south far past Harbin (although indicators of permafrost activity are lacking so far back in time). Similarly, the Northeast China Plain during the late Middle Pleistocene was home to the Mammuthus–Coelodonta Fauna, an assemblage of animals adapted for a cold steppe, most notably the woolly mammoth and the woolly rhinoceros. In addition to the woolly mammoth, the Dongjiang Bridge locality also features the giant deer Sinomegaceros ordosianus, Przewalski's horse, elk, the buffalo Bubalus wansjock, and the brown bear.

See also 
 Maba Man
 Red Deer Cave people

References

External links 

 2021 article in the New York Times

1933 archaeological discoveries
Prehistoric mammals of Asia
Fossil taxa described in 2021
2021 in paleontology
People from Harbin
History of Harbin
Harbin Heritage Sites
Human evolution
Fossils of China